Lucas Sithole (born 30 September 1986) is a South African wheelchair tennis player. He plays in the Quad division of the sport. Sithole is the 2013 US Open wheelchair tennis quad champion. He also won the 2016 Australian Open Grand Slam in doubles, partnering David Wagner.

Due to missing certain anti-doping tests, Sithole was suspended from competition between 30 September 2019 and 30 September 2021.

Tennis career

Lucas Sithole started competing in international wheelchair tennis events in 2006. In July 2011, he won the British Open wheelchair tennis tournament (Super Series) in Nottingham, Great Britain. In 2013, Sithole won the US Open Grand Slam. In the final, he played against World No 1 David Wagner, and won 3–6, 6–4, 6–4.

In the 2017 UNIQLO Wheelchair Doubles Masters, Lucas Sithole and Heath Davidson finished at the third place.

Sithole is the first African player to win a Super Series Event or a Grand Slam.

In 2018, Sithole was a runner-up alongside Dylan Alcott at the first ever men's quads doubles event during the 2018 Wimbledon Championships.

Personal life
Sithole is a native of  KwaZulu-Natal. He became a triple amputee in 1998 following a train accident.

References

1986 births
Living people
South African male tennis players
Paralympic wheelchair tennis players of South Africa
Wheelchair tennis players at the 2012 Summer Paralympics
Wheelchair tennis players at the 2016 Summer Paralympics
Doping cases in tennis
21st-century South African people